Cantonale elections to renew canton general councillors were held in France on 7 and 14 March 1976. The left won a convincing victory, the PS gained 194 seats and the PCF 75. 15 presidencies also swung to the left.

Electoral system

The cantonales elections use the same system as the regional or legislative elections. There is a 10% threshold (10% of registered voters) needed to proceed to the second round.

National results

Runoff results missing

Sources

Alain Lancelot, Les élections sous la Ve République, PUF, Paris, 1988

1976
1976 elections in France